Quinlan is an unincorporated community in Woodward County, Oklahoma, United States.

Demographics

References

Unincorporated communities in Woodward County, Oklahoma
Unincorporated communities in Oklahoma